Port Moody-Westwood was a provincial electoral district for the Legislative Assembly of British Columbia, Canada, from 2001 to 2009.

Demographics

Member of Legislative Assembly

Election results 

|-

|-
 
|NDP
|Karen Rockwell
|align="right"|9,848
|align="right"|37.38%
|align="right"|
|align="right"|$59,981

|James Filippelli
|align="right"|442
|align="right"|1.68%
|align="right"|
|align="right"|$710

|Independent
|Arthur Crossman
|align="right"|227
|align="right"|0.86%
|align="right"|
|align="right"|$125

|}

|-

|-
 
|NDP
|Brian Revel
|align="right"|4,178
|align="right"|18.90%
|align="right"|
|align="right"|$9,282

|}

External links 
BC Stats Profile
Results of 2001 election (pdf)
2001 Expenditures (pdf)
Website of the Legislative Assembly of British Columbia

Former provincial electoral districts of British Columbia
Politics of Coquitlam
Port Moody